Daniel Nathan Lewis (February 14, 1936 – March 6, 2015) was an American football halfback, fullback in the National Football League for the Detroit Lions (1958–1964), the Washington Redskins (1965), and the New York Giants (1966).  He played college football at the University of Wisconsin.

Early years
Lewis was born in 1936 in Freehold, New Jersey. He played high school football at Freehold High School in Freehold Borough, New Jersey.

College
Lewis played college football for the Wisconsin Badgers. As a junior in 1956, he totaled 606 yards from scrimmage, including 554 rushing yards on 100 carries for an average of 5.5 yards per carry.  As a senior in 1957, he gained 782 yards from scrimmage, including 611 rushing yards on 95 carries for an average of 6.4 yards per carry. His 1957 tally of 611 rushing yards ranked fourth best in the Big Ten Conference.

Professional football
Lewis was drafted by the Detroit Lions in the sixth round (73rd overall pick) of the 1958 NFL Draft. He played seven years with the Lions form 1958 to 1964. He led the team in 1962 with 488 rushing yards and again in 1963 with 528 rushing yards. He was the first African American to lead the Lions in rushing. At the end of his career with the Lions, he ranked fourth in franchise history with 2,698 rushing yards.

In September 1965, Lewis was traded to the Washington Redskins in exchange for a draft choice. Playing at fullback, Lewis ranked second on the Redskins with 343 rushing yards in 1965.

Lewis was cut by the Redskins after the 1965 season. He signed with the Atlanta Falcons in the off-season but was released before the start of the 1966 NFL season. He signed as a free agent with the New York Giants in September 1966. In his final NFL season, Lewis appeared in 13 games for the Giants, rushing for 164 yards on 32 carries.

Family and later years
Lewis and his wife, Marian, had three sons.  After retiring from football, Lewis worked as Detroit's deputy director of city planning. In March 2015, he died in Detroit of complications from diabetes.

References

1936 births
2015 deaths
Freehold High School alumni
People from Freehold Borough, New Jersey
People from Freehold Township, New Jersey
Players of American football from New Jersey
Sportspeople from Monmouth County, New Jersey
American football running backs
Detroit Lions players
Washington Redskins players
New York Giants players
Wisconsin Badgers football players